Olli Rahnasto (born 28 December 1965) is a retired professional tennis player from Finland.

Rahnasto turned pro in 1982.  During his career, he won two ATP Tour doubles titles and reached a career high doubles ranking of No. 79 in 1986.  He was a member of the Finland Davis Cup team, and led the team to the World Group Qualifying round in 1990.  He retired in 1995.

ATP Tour finals

Doubles (2 wins, 2 losses)

See also
List of Finland Davis Cup team representatives

References

External links
 
 
 

1965 births
Living people
Finnish male tennis players
People from Seinäjoki
Sportspeople from South Ostrobothnia